The Sheeks–Robertson House is a historic home in downtown Austin, Texas.

The home is located at Sixth Street and West Lynn. It was added to the National Register of Historic Places in 1976.

References

Houses on the National Register of Historic Places in Texas
Houses in Austin, Texas
National Register of Historic Places in Austin, Texas
City of Austin Historic Landmarks
Houses completed in 1897
1897 establishments in Texas